This article describes the history of cricket in India from the 1960–61 season until 1970.

Events 

One team totally dominated Indian cricket in the 1960s.  As part of 15 consecutive victories in the Ranji Trophy from 1958–59 to 1972–73, Bombay won the title in all ten seasons of the period under review.  Among its players were Farokh Engineer, Dilip Sardesai, Bapu Nadkarni, Ramakant Desai, Baloo Gupte, Ashok Mankad and Ajit Wadekar.

In the 1961–62 season, the Duleep Trophy was inaugurated as a zonal competition.  It was named after former England cricket and Ranjitsinhji's nephew, Kumar Shri Duleepsinhji (1905–59).  With Bombay in its catchment, it is not surprising that the West Zone won six of the first nine titles.

Domestic cricket

Ranji Trophy winners
 1960–61 – Bombay
 1961–62 – Bombay
 1962–63 – Bombay
 1963–64 – Bombay
 1964–65 – Bombay
 1965–66 – Bombay
 1966–67 – Bombay
 1967–68 – Bombay
 1968–69 – Bombay
 1969–70 – Bombay

Duleep Trophy winners
 1961–62 – West Zone
 1962–63 – West Zone
 1963–64 – West Zone
 1964–65 – West Zone
 1965–66 – South Zone
 1966–67 – South Zone
 1967–68 – South Zone
 1968–69 – West Zone
 1969–70 – West Zone

Leading players by season 

The lists below give the leading first-class runscorers and wicket-takers in each domestic season.

Batsmen
 1960–61 –

Bowlers
 1960–61 –

International cricket

International tours of India

Pakistan 1960–61
 1st Test at Brabourne Stadium, Bombay – match drawn	
 2nd Test at Modi Stadium, Kanpur – match drawn	
 3rd Test at Eden Gardens, Calcutta – match drawn	
 4th Test at Nehru Stadium, Madras – match drawn	
 5th Test at Feroz Shah Kotla, Delhi – match drawn

England 1961–62
 1st Test at Brabourne Stadium, Bombay – match drawn	
 2nd Test at Modi Stadium, Kanpur – match drawn	
 3rd Test at Feroz Shah Kotla, Delhi – match drawn	
 4th Test at Eden Gardens, Calcutta – India won by 187 runs
 5th Test at Nehru Stadium, Madras – India won by 128 runs

International XI 1961–62

International Cavaliers 1962–63
The International Cavaliers toured Africa and India in 1962–63 to promote cricket. The team included Norm O'Neill, Barry Shepherd. Richie Benaud, Garth McKenzie, Arthur Morris, Mickey Stewart and Roy Swetman.

England 1963–64
 1st Test at Nehru Stadium, Madras – match drawn	
 2nd Test at Brabourne Stadium, Bombay – match drawn	
 3rd Test at Eden Gardens, Calcutta – match drawn	
 4th Test at Feroz Shah Kotla, Delhi – match drawn	
 5th Test at Modi Stadium, Kanpur – match drawn

EW Swanton's XI 1963–64

Australia 1964–65
 1st Test at Nehru Stadium, Madras – Australia won by 139 runs
 2nd Test at Brabourne Stadium, Bombay – India won by 2 wickets
 3rd Test at Eden Gardens, Calcutta – match drawn

New Zealand 1964–65
 1st Test at Nehru Stadium, Madras – match drawn	
 2nd Test at Eden Gardens, Calcutta – match drawn	
 3rd Test at Brabourne Stadium, Bombay – match drawn	
 4th Test at Feroz Shah Kotla, Delhi – India won by 7 wickets

Ceylon 1964–65
For information about this tour, see : Ceylon cricket team in India in 1964–65

Commonwealth XI 1964–65
For information about this tour, see : Commonwealth XI cricket team in India in 1964-65

West Indies 1966–67
 1st Test at Brabourne Stadium, Bombay – West Indies won by 6 wickets
 2nd Test at Eden Gardens, Calcutta – West Indies won by an innings and 45 runs
 3rd Test at MA Chidambaram Stadium, Chepauk, Madras – match drawn

International XI 1967–68

Ceylon 1968–69

New Zealand 1969–70
 1st Test at Brabourne Stadium, Bombay – India won by 60 runs
 2nd Test at Vidarbha Cricket Association Ground, Nagpur – New Zealand won by 167 runs
 3rd Test at Lal Bahadur Shastri Stadium, Hyderabad – match drawn

Australia 1969–70
 1st Test at Brabourne Stadium, Bombay – Australia won by 8 wickets
 2nd Test at Modi Stadium, Kanpur – match drawn	
 3rd Test at Feroz Shah Kotla, Delhi – India won by 7 wickets
 4th Test at Eden Gardens, Calcutta – Australia won by 10 wickets
 5th Test at MA Chidambaram Stadium, Chepauk, Madras – Australia won by 77 runs

For information about this tour, see : Australian cricket team in Ceylon and India in 1969-70

References

Further reading
 Rowland Bowen, Cricket: A History of its Growth and Development, Eyre & Spottiswoode, 1970
 Vasant Raiji, India's Hambledon Men, Tyeby Press, 1986
 Mihir Bose, A History of Indian Cricket, Andre-Deutsch, 1990
 Ramachandra Guha, A Corner of a Foreign Field – An Indian History of a British Sport, Picador, 2001

External sources
 CricketArchive – Itinerary of Events in India

1970
1970